The FIA WTCC Race of Mexico was a round of the World Touring Car Championship, held at the Autódromo Miguel E. Abed near the city of Puebla in Mexico.

The race was first run in the 2005 season, the first season of the revived series. It was run every year between 2005 and 2009 except in the 2007 season, when the planned event was cancelled due to problems with the Puebla circuit, although these problems were addressed for 2008. The event was run in June in 2005, in July in 2006, in April in 2008 and in March in 2009. The 2010 running was cancelled due to security fears in the region.

Winners

References

Mexico
World Touring Car Championship